Rabbi Chaim Kreiswirth (1918–2001) was an Orthodox rabbi who served as the longtime Chief Rabbi of Congregation Machzikei Hadass Antwerp, Belgium. He was the founder and rosh yeshiva of the Mercaz HaTorah yeshiva in Jerusalem, and was a highly regarded Torah scholar.

Early years
Rabbi Kreiswirth was born in Wojnicz, Poland in 1918, the son of Rabbi Avrohom Yosef Schermann and Perla Kreiswirth. In his youth, he was well known for his brilliance, excellent character traits and geniality, dubbed the "Cracower Illui" at age 15 in recognition of his prodigious powers of Talmudic analysis.

Rabbi Kreiswirth studied for many years in the famous Torah centers of Poland and Lithuania. Upon application to the Chachmei Lublin Yeshiva, he was tested by the Rosh Yeshiva, Rabbi Meir Shapiro.  Rabbi Shapiro was impressed by Rabbi Kreiswirth's proficiency in all aspects of Torah.  Rabbi Chaim Ozer Grodzinski as well as rabbi Chanoch Henoch Eigis were very fond of him and gave his sefer on Tractate Zevachim a warm recommendation (the manuscript was lost during the World War II).

Rabbi Kreiswirth received Semicha from Rabbi Chanoch Henich Eigess.

Second World War
With the 1939 German invasion of Poland, Rabbi Kreiswirth fled to Lithuania.

In Lithuania, he married the daughter of the Slabodka Mashgiach, Rabbi Avraham Grodzinski. The couple then left via Vilna to Palestine, where he met many famous personalities, including the Brisker Rav, the Chazon Ish, the Steipler, Rabbi Shlomo Zalman Auerbach and Rabbi Yosef Shalom Elyashiv.

Post-World War II
At the end of World War II, Rabbi Kreiswirth returned to Poland in an attempt to rescue Jewish children who had been sheltered by the Catholic Church for the war's duration.

In 1947, he moved to the United States and from 1947 to 1953 served as Rosh Yeshiva at the Hebrew Theological College in Skokie, Illinois.

In 1953 he moved to Antwerp in an effort to rebuild the Jewish community there.  This move was against the counsel of the Chazon Ish, and the Amshinover Rebbe.

Rabbi Kreiswirth devoted the rest of his life to the Belgian community, became the Av Beth Din and Posek in Antwerp and was active in Agudath Israel.

Death
Rabbi Kreiswirth died on Sunday 30 December 2001 (16 Tevet 5762 on the Hebrew calendar) shortly before midnight, aged 82, after suffering from an illness. He is buried on Har HaMenuchot.

Thousands of people came from all over Europe to participate in the funeral in Antwerp.  Among the eulogizers were Dayan Yitzchok Tuvia Weiss and Dayan Elya Sternbuch of Antwerp.  The main funeral and burial was held in Jerusalem, where, among many, Rabbi Nosson Tzvi Finkel and Rabbi Kreiswirth's son Rabbi Dov Kreiswirth of Lakewood gave eulogies.

In 2015, Rav Dov Kreiswirth (Chaim Kreiswirth's son) and Rav Zvi Twersky established Yeshivas Toras Chaim in the Romema neighborhood of Jerusalem in Rav Chaim Kreiswirth's name.

References

External links
Rav Chaim Kreiswirth zt”l, On His Yahrtzeit, Tomorrow, 16 Teves

Yeshivas Toras Chaim

1918 births
2001 deaths
20th-century American rabbis
20th-century Belgian Jews
21st-century Belgian Jews
Belgian Ashkenazi Jews
Rosh yeshivas
Polish Haredi rabbis
Belgian Orthodox rabbis
Belgian people of Polish-Jewish descent
People from Tarnów County
Burials at Har HaMenuchot
Judaism in Antwerp